Shannon Leigh Brown (born July 23, 1973) is an American country music singer from Spirit Lake, Iowa. Although she has recorded three albums on various labels, only one of these – 2006's Corn Fed — was released. In her career, she has charted four singles on the Billboard country charts, with her highest-charting single being a 2002 cover of Deborah Allen's "Baby I Lied," at number 40. She also contributed the song "Half a Man" to the soundtrack for the 1998 film Happy, Texas.

Biography

After several years of touring the Midwest with her father running the soundboard and her mom running lights, Shannon decided to make the move to Nashville, Tennessee. She paid the bills singing songwriters' demo sessions and managed to maintain her touring schedule of 160 dates a year. Her vocal stylings and industrious approach did not go unnoticed. She is married to video director Shaun Silva who directed the video for "Corn Fed."

Musical career
Shannon's first recording contract was with Arista Nashville in 1997. A year later, she began work on her debut album A Tour of My Heart. Although the album's lead-off single (titled "I Won't Lie") entered the Billboard Hot Country Singles & Tracks (now Hot Country Songs) charts, A Tour of My Heart was ultimately unreleased. Brown also contributed the song "Half a Man" to the soundtrack of the film Happy, Texas in 1998

In late 2001, she left for the BNA label. While on BNA, she began work on a second album, from which two singles were released. The first of these, a song titled "Baby I Lied," was a cover of Deborah Allen's Top 5 hit single from 1983. Brown's cover became her only Top 40 hit upon its release. A second single from her BNA album, titled "Untangle My Heart," also charted. Brown's second album also remained unreleased, however, and she exited BNA not long afterward.

Warner Bros. Records signed Brown to her third recording contract in late 2005. That year, she made her fourth chart entry with the song "Corn Fed." Reaching a peak of 47 on the country music charts, it served as the lead-off single to her first album for Warner Bros., also titled Corn Fed. Her third album overall, Corn Fed was also Brown's first album to be released commercially. The album was produced by John Rich, one half of country music duo Big & Rich. After its second single, "Pearls," failed to chart, Brown and Warner Bros. parted ways.

Discography

Albums

Singles

Notes
A^ "I Won't Lie" also peaked at number 67 on the RPM Country Tracks chart in Canada.

Music videos

External links

1973 births
American country singer-songwriters
American women country singers
Living people
BNA Records artists
Warner Records artists
Arista Nashville artists
People from Spirit Lake, Iowa
Country musicians from Iowa
21st-century American women singers
Singer-songwriters from Iowa